Law Cheung-kwok (born 26 September 1949, Hong Kong) was a member of the Sai Kung District Council (1994–2007) representing Hong King. He was also a member of the Legislative Council (1995–97) representing for the Election Committee. He joined the Provisional Legislative Council which existed from 1996 to 1998 with other members of the Association for Democracy and People's Livelihood (ADPL), while other pro-democrats boycotted it. He quit the ADPL around 1998 and joined the New Century Forum and Civil Force afterward. He contested in the 1998 and 2000 Legislative Council but failed to go back to the Legislative Council.

References

1949 births
Living people
Members of the Provisional Legislative Council
District councillors of Sai Kung District
Hong Kong Association for Democracy and People's Livelihood politicians
New Century Forum politicians
Civil Force politicians
Members of the National Committee of the Chinese People's Political Consultative Conference
HK LegCo Members 1995–1997